Old Bolshevik was an unofficial designation for those who were members of the Bolshevik party before the Russian Revolution of 1917.

Old Bolshevik or Stary Bolshevik may also refer to:
Soviet ship Stary Bolshevik
Stary Bolshevik, a fictional ship from the novel Us Conductors
Stary Bolshevik Publishers, a publishing house of the Society of Old Bolsheviks